Ruth Jacott (born 2 September 1960) is a Surinamese-Dutch singer.

Jacott transitioned from musical theatre to popular music in 1993, when she represented the Netherlands at the Eurovision Song Contest 1993. Her song, "Vrede" (Peace), was one of the favorites to win, and ended up ranking sixth out of 25 at Millstreet. She has since released nine Dutch-language albums, four of which made the Top Ten on the Dutch music charts.

Biography
Ruth Jacott was born in Suriname and at nine, moved with her family to The Netherlands, where at 17 she took part in a talent contest, after which she received many offers to perform. She dropped out of the Hilversum Conservatory and began her career with The Vips and bands like The Skymasters, the VARA-Dansorkest and the Metropole Orkest.

Breakthrough
In 1988, Jacott won the Knokke Festival in Belgium. After this success, she had many offers to work in the musical world. She landed key roles in Dutch and German-language productions of Cats and A Night at the Cotton Club, touring The Netherlands, Belgium, Germany and Switzerland. In 1989, Jacott received the Zilveren Harp (Silver Harp) award. One year later, she sang the duet "Tegyo Makandra" with Hans Vermeulen, in commemoration of a plane crash in Paramaribo, the capital of Suriname. The duet was also released after the 1992 crash of an El Al flight in the Bijlmer (southeast Amsterdam), and became a hit.

In 1993, her career took an important turn when she was asked to represent The Netherlands at the Eurovision Song Festival in Ireland. She received 92 points and ranked No. 6 with the song "Vrede" (Peace).

Her Dutch-language debut album Ruth Jacott was released shortly afterwards. In July, she had a big hit together with Paul de Leeuw with the duet "Blijf bij mij" (Stay with me). She sang this song solo during the Dutch heat of Eurovision. In Spring 1994, her second album "Hou me vast" (Hold me tight) came out and went double platinum in the Dutch market. In addition, she collaborated on albums with Gerard Joling, René Froger and Oscar Harris. With the charity single Buseruka, written together with listeners of Dutch radio station 3FM, she was able to collect donations for UNICEF and Oxfam Novib projects in Rwanda.

Her third album "Geheimen" (Secrets) was released in 1995 and went gold. She performed shows in major Dutch theaters, but became exhausted and needed to rest her voice. In February 1997, she was honored with a "Golden Harp" award. Two months later, her album Hartslag (Heartbeat) was released, which was also successful and was followed by another tour.

The compilation album Altijd Dichtbij (Always close) was released in 1998 and contained a selection of five years of hits. She sang the theme song of the Dutch film Kruimeltje.

2000s
In 2000, she had an operation on her vocal cords. Once she recovered, she embarked on a new theater-tour. Her album Vals verlangen (False desire) went gold and in October, she performed at Amsterdam's Carré Theater which was filmed by TV network RTL 4 and recorded for CD release.

In 2002, the album Tastbaar (Tangible) was released and the single Onderhuids (Under my skin). Both were produced by Humphrey Campbell and the Dutch singing duo Fluitsma & Van Tijn. Two years later, the duet Nu Is Het Over (Now it's over) with Mark Dakriet (Re-Play) was released.

In 2004, the compilation CD Het Beste Van Ruth Jacott''' (The best of Ruth Jacott) was released.

In the 2005–06 Dutch theater season, Ruth was again in Dutch theaters with her show A Touch of Latin in which she sang both in Dutch and Spanish, with some numbers reworked in a Latin style. By popular demand, the tour was prolonged and followed by a second tour in the 2006–07 season.

In 2008, Jacott played the title role in the musical Billie Holiday about the legendary African American singer. Her performance was well received by both critics and the public. On 2 June 2008, she received the Dutch Musical Award for "Best Female Lead in a Small Musical". In December, Ruth appeared with her own Christmas show, which was also well received.

On 23 March 2009, the single Jammer, maar helaas (Too bad) was released from her Latin double-CD Passie (Passion), which followed on 20 April 2009. CD 1 contained the original-language versions and CD 2 the Dutch-language versions. Passie was promoted with another tour starting in autumn of 2009.

2010s
In 2010, Jacott was a guest at the "Toppers" concert in the Amsterdam ArenA, where a quartet of well-known Dutch-language pop singers performed a high-camp show and where other top Dutch musical stars appeared as special guests. Jacott played a supporting role in 't Spaanse Schaep (The Spanish Sheep) as Jopie Vrijman. In June 2010, Jacott climbed Alpe d'Huez for the Radio 2 team on Radio 2's evening commute show "Knooppunt Kranenbarg" (Kranenbarg Junction). In 2016, she participated in the song-exchange-programme Ali B op volle toeren; Jacott was paired to rapper I Am Aisha who reworked Vrede.

Starting in February 2011, Jacott can be seen in her one-woman show Simply the Best, in which she performs songs and tells her life story in between the songs. On 4 October, she released a new single duet with Edsilia Rombley called "Uit Het Oog, Niet Uit Mijn Hart".

 Discography 
 Albums 

|-
|align="left"|Ruth Jacott||1993||1 May 1993||30||23|| Platinum
|-
|align="left"|Hou me vast||1994||14 May 1994||2||80|| 2× Platinum
|-
|align="left"|Geheimen||1995||14 October 1995||8||40|| Gold
|-
|align="left"|Hartslag||1997||12 April 1997||2||35|| Platinum
|-
|align="left"|Altijd dichtbij: De hitcollectie||1998||7 March 1998||11||16|| Compilation
|-
|align="left"|Vals verlangen||1999||1 May 1999||6||16|| Gold
|-
|align="left"|Live in Carré||2000||2 December 2000||44||13|| Live album
|-
|align="left"|Tastbaar||2002||16 November 2002||28||9||
|-
|align="left"|Het beste van Ruth Jacott||2004||13 March 2004||23||14|| Compilation
|-
|align="left"|Passie||17 April 2009||25 April 2009||13||18||
|-
|align="left"|A tribute to Billie Holiday||2010||20 November 2010||41||3|| with the Metropole Orkest dir. by Michael Abene
|-
|align="left"|Simply the Best||2012||15 Maart 2012||20||12|| Live album
|-
|align="left"|Ik Adem Je In||2014||03 Oktober 2014 ||09||11||
|-
|align="left"|RUTH LIVE - EP||2020||30 April 2020||49||09|| Live ep
|}

 Singles 

|-
|align="left"|Teygo Makandra||1989||19 May 1990||tip17||-|| met Hans Vermeulen / No. 60 in de Single Top 100
|-
|align="left"|Teygo Makandra||1992||24 October 1992||20||4|| met Hans Vermeulen / re-release / No. 27 in de Single Top 100 / Alarmschijf|-
|align="left"|Vrede||1993||15 May 1993||16||7|| Eurovisiesongfestival / No. 16 in de Single Top 100
|-
|align="left"|Blijf bij mij||1993||3 July 1993||5||10|| met Paul de Leeuw / No. 5 in de Single Top 100 / Alarmschijf|-
|align="left"|Onderweg naar morgen||1994||5 February 1994||24||5|| Tune voor de soap Onderweg Naar Morgen / No. 15 in de Single Top 100
|-
|align="left"|Vrij met mij||1994||23 April 1994||25||6|| No. 19 in de Single Top 100
|-
|align="left"|Buseruka (Lied voor Rwanda) / Ik kan echt zonder jou||1994||16 July 1994||8||12|| No. 8 in de Single Top 100
|-
|align="left"|Ik hou zoveel van jou (Rad van fortuin)||1994||15 October 1994||33||3|| No. 30 in de Single Top 100
|-
|align="left"|Zon voor de maan||1994||17 December 1994||tip18||-||
|-
|align="left"|You've got a friend||1995||9 September 1995||3||6|| met Marco Borsato & René Froger / No. 3 in de Single Top 100
|-
|align="left"|Ik ga door||1995||30 September 1995||20||5|| No. 24 in de Single Top 100
|-
|align="left"|Kippevel||1995||25 November 1995||tip11||-||
|-
|align="left"|Hij gaat voor C!||1997||8 February 1997||3||8|| als BN'ers voor BNN / No. 3 in de Single Top 100
|-
|align="left"|Hartslag||1997||5 April 1997||32||6|| No. 39 in de Single Top 100
|-
|align="left"|Altijd dichtbij||1997||5 July 1997||tip2||-|| Ter promotie van KPN telefonie / No. 49 in de Single Top 100
|-
|align="left"|Liefde of lust||1997||18 October 1997||tip16||-|| No. 81 in de Single Top 100
|-
|align="left"|Wat jij wil||1997||-|||||| No. 76 in de Single Top 100
|-
|align="left"|Het laatste moment||1998||-|||||| No. 86 in de Single Top 100
|-
|align="left"|Leun op mij||1999||27 March 1999||11||11|| No. 13 in de Single Top 100
|-
|align="left"|Kop dicht en kus me||1999||-|||||| No. 92 in de Single Top 100
|-
|align="left"|Kruimeltje||1999||-|||||| Titelsong Kruimeltje / No. 85 in de Single Top 100
|-
|align="left"|Waar ben je nou?||2000||-|||||| No. 68 in de Single Top 100
|-
|align="left"|Onderhuids||2002||-|||||| No. 93 in de Single Top 100
|-
|align="left"|Nu het over is||2004||-|||||| met Mark / No. 37 in de Single Top 100
|-
|align="left"|Als je iets kan doen||6 January 2005||15 January 2005||1(4wk)||9|| als Artiesten voor Azië / No. 1 in de Single Top 100 / Alarmschijf|-
|align="left"|Jammer maar helaas||2009||-||||||
|-
|align="left"|Seki Marinda||2009||-||||||
|-
|align="left"|Kom dans met mij||2009||-||||||
|-
|align="left"|Terug bij mij||2009||-||||||
|-
|align="left"|Uit Het Oog, Niet Uit Mijn Hart''||4 October 2011||-||TBD||||
|}

References

External links

 

1960 births
Living people
20th-century Surinamese women singers
21st-century Dutch women singers
21st-century Dutch singers
Eurovision Song Contest entrants for the Netherlands
Eurovision Song Contest entrants of 1993
Surinamese emigrants to the Netherlands
People from Paramaribo